Ourania may refer to
 Urania or Ourania, the muse of astronomy
Ourania (novel), by French Nobel laureate J. M. G. Le Clézio 
Ourania Gkouzou (born 1981), Greek volleyball player
Ourania Rebouli (born 1989), Greek long-distance runner